Kalpana Raghavendar (born 8 May 1980)  is an Indian playback singer, winner of Idea Star Singer Malayalam and participant in Bigg Boss Telugu Season 1, songwriter and actor.  She started her career as a playback singer at the age of five, and as of 2013 had recorded 1,500 tracks and performed in 3,000 shows in India and abroad.

In 2010 she was the winner of the south Indian singing show Star Singer season 5, conducted by the Malayalam TV channel Asianet. she was a judge of Super Singer Junior 6.

Early life and background
Kalpana was born in a musical family. Her father, T. S. Raghavendra, was a reputed playback singer, actor and composer, while her mother, Sulochana, is also a singer. She has a younger sister, Shekinah Shawn (born Prasanna Raghavendar) who is popular as an Opera singer. Kalpana took her Carnatic music lessons under Madurai T. Srinivasan. Apart from her proficiency in singing, she holds a Master of Computer Applications degree and is pursuing Master of Philosophy.

Career
Kalpana began her musical career at the age of 5. Her first vocals were for a family song alongside P. Susheela, Mano, M. M. Srilekha and her younger sister Prasanna, composed by the music director Saluri Vasurao. As an adult, she started her career as a full-fledged playback singer in 1999 by rendering her voice for the song Mangalagouriki from the Telugu film Manoharam under music director Mani Sharma. She has also worked with many legendary composers and singers like M. S. Viswanathan, Ilaiyaraaja, A. R. Rahman, K. V. Mahadevan, S. P. Balasubrahmanyam and K. S. Chithra. She is more familiar to the public as a stage performer rather than a playback singer, having performed nearly 3000 stage shows worldwide. In 2013, Kalpana was the lead performer in a tribute concert for her guru, Madurai T. Srinivasan.

Television

Won Nandi award for Best Playback Singer Female for the song "Navamoorthulainatti"

Discography
List of songs recorded by Kalpana Raghavendar

References

External links

 Television interview on ABN Andhra Jyothi
 Television interview on TV9

Indian women playback singers
Indian voice actresses
Singers from Chennai
Indian women classical singers
Living people
Tamil playback singers
Telugu playback singers
20th-century Indian singers
20th-century Indian women singers
21st-century Indian women singers
21st-century Indian singers
Women musicians from Tamil Nadu
1977 births
Bigg Boss (Telugu TV series) contestants